Mr Dessoye, député de la Haute Marne, ministre : photographie de presse
Arthur Dessoye (23 August 1854, in Auberive – 30 April 1927) was a French politician. He represented the Independent Radicals in the Chamber of Deputies from 1906 to 1919. He was Minister of Public Instruction in 1914.

References

External links
 Assemblée nationale: database of deputies 

1854 births
1927 deaths
People from Haute-Marne
Politicians from Grand Est
Independent Radical politicians
French Ministers of National Education
Members of the 9th Chamber of Deputies of the French Third Republic
Members of the 10th Chamber of Deputies of the French Third Republic
Members of the 11th Chamber of Deputies of the French Third Republic